Ferdinand Fellner (19 April 1847 – 22 March 1916) was an Austrian architect.

Biography
Fellner joined his ailing father's architecture firm at the age of nineteen. After his death he founded the architecture studio Fellner & Helmer together with Hermann Helmer in 1873.

References

1847 births
1916 deaths
Architects from Vienna
Baroque Revival architects
TU Wien alumni